The 2027 Saarland state election will be held in 2027 to elect the 18th Landtag of Saarland.

Opinion polls

References

See also 

Elections in Saarland
2027 elections in Germany